Vasko Mladenov (born 30 July 1989) is a former professional Bulgarian tennis player.

On 6 June 2016, he reached his highest ATP singles ranking of World No. 637 in June 2016 whilst his best doubles ranking was No. 359 in June 2016. Mladenov is a winner of seventeen ITF titles in doubles.

Mladenov is also a two time Bulgarian National Champion (2016 and 2017). He participated in the Davis Cup in doubles in March 2016 against Turkey, bringing Bulgaria a historic win 7:6, 6:7, 6:7, 7:6, 6:4 alongside fellow Bulgarian Alexander Lazov.

Mladenov also took part in the Davis Cup tie against Tunisia in August 2016, where he won his singles match against Moez Echargui in a thrilling 6:7, 7:5, 7:6 match. He also took part in the Davis Cup group 3 tie against Iceland, Macedonia, Albania and finally Bulgaria faced Monaco in the deciding playoff to promote to group 2, unfortunately Bulgaria lost the tie. He made his debut at an ATP tournament in 2018, playing in his native Bulgaria the ATP Sofia Open. He worked as an official sparring partner with Novak Djokovic for the 2013 Us Open. Vasko is also a rapper and a music producer, writing his own music and lyrics, mainly in Russian. He has released 3 albums and multiple single records such as "Химия", "Океаны".

Early and personal life
Vasko was born in Sofia, Bulgaria, as the only child of Vasil, who is from Bulgaria and, Elena, who is from Russia. When he was five he began to play with his grandfather, Lev Shulga, who is a well known coach from the former U.S.S.R. Vasko speaks fluent Bulgarian, Russian and English. He is known for his aggressive and all-court style of play. Mladenov has a right-handed forehand and double-handed backhand. His favourite surface is hard. His hobbies are listening to music, playing the piano, playing snooker, billiards and playing football. Currently he resides in Sofia, and is coached by Levar Harper-Griffith and Miroslav Gergov.

Junior career
He won three tournaments as a junior. The first one was in 2005, he defeated Plamen Avramov in Plovdiv in straight sets, final score was 6–0, 6–1. The second one also was in 2005, in Timișoara, he defeated Maksim Bakunin in three sets, 6–4, 4–6, 7–6(4). The third and final one was in 2006, in Kyiv, he won the tournament after beating Uladzimir Ignatik in three sets, 3–6, 6–3, 6–1. All these tournaments were played on clay court. In 2007, in France, he played the European Junior. Bulgaria was represented by Vasko, Valentin Dimov and Aleksandar Lazov, they were runners-up.

Year-end rankings

Challenger and Futures/World Tennis Tour finals

Singles: 2 (0–2)

Doubles: 31 (17–14)

Davis Cup 
Vasko Mladenov debuted for the Bulgaria Davis Cup team in 2016 against Turkey in Ankara. Since then he has a 1–0 singles record and a 4–2 doubles record (5–2 overall). He participated in Davis Cup in doubles in March 2016 against Turkey, bringing Bulgaria a historic win 7:6, 6:7, 6:7, 7:6, 6:4 alongside fellow Bulgarian Alexander Lazov. 
Mladenov also took part in the Davis Cup tie against Tunisia in August 2016, where he won his singles match against Moez Echargui in a thrilling 6:7, 7:5, 7:6 match. He also took part in the Davis Cup group 3 tie against Iceland, Macedonia, Albania and finally Bulgaria faced Monaco in the deciding playoff to promote to group 2, unfortunately Bulgaria lost the tie.

Singles (1–0)

Doubles (4–2) 

 RPO = Relegation Play–off
 PPO = Promotion Play–off
 RR = Round Robin

References

External links

 
 
 
https://www.facebook.com/vaskomladenovtennis/?ref=aymt_homepage_panel
https://www.facebook.com/vaskomusic/?fref=ts
https://twitter.com/vaskomladenov
https://soundcloud.com/vasko-music

Bulgarian male tennis players
1989 births
Living people
Sportspeople from Sofia
21st-century Bulgarian people